Edie Brickell is the third solo album by American singer-songwriter Edie Brickell, released in January 2011, in the same month that she released another album with her new band, The Gaddabouts.

Development 
Brickell started work on the album during her 2003 tour supporting Volcano. According to Brickell, "The first three songs for the solo album were recorded on a day off during the tour. They were all new songs and I wanted to record them while they were fresh and we were feeling them. Too many times I had waited months, even years to record a song and by that time, the feeling was gone and the song came out like a memory instead of an experience. So, any time I got a batch of five or six songs, I’d get together with the band and record them while they were new. I wanted to make a record where every song communicated a strong and true energy."

Track listing

Personnel 
Musicians
 Edie Brickell – vocals, guitars
 Carter Albrecht – acoustic piano, Wurlitzer electric piano, organ, vocals
 David Boyle – keyboards, acoustic piano, Wurlitzer electric piano, Chamberlin, sampling
 Dave Palmer – grand piano
 Charlie Sexton – acoustic piano, clavinet, Mellotron, organ, 12-string acoustic guitar, acoustic guitar, electric guitars, double bass, percussion, vocals
 Dave Monsey – bass guitar
 J.J. Johnson – drums
Jim Oblon – drums, drum programming, dumbek

Production
 Charlie Sexton – producer
 Kyle Crusham – engineer
 Dave McNair – engineer
 Brian Scheuble – engineer
 Jared Tuten – engineer
 Andy Smith – mixing
 Kevin Porter – mixing
 Greg Calbi – mastering
 Amy Beth McNeely – package design

References 

Edie Brickell albums
2011 albums